Bernardus Adriaan “Barry” Hulshoff (30 September 1946 – 16 February 2020) was a Dutch footballer who played for Ajax Amsterdam and was part of their European Cup victories in 1971, 1972 and 1973. He earned 14 caps for the Netherlands national football team.

After his playing career, he coached Ajax for one season and then a number of Belgian football teams.

Honours
Ajax
Eredivisie: 1965–66, 1966–67, 1967–68, 1969–70, 1971–72, 1972–73
KNVB Cup: 1966–67, 1969–70, 1970–71, 1971–72
European Cup: 1970–71, 1971–72, 1972–73
European Super Cup: 1972, 1973
Intercontinental Cup: 1972

References

External links

1946 births
2020 deaths
Association football defenders
Dutch footballers
Netherlands international footballers
Eredivisie players
AFC Ajax players
MVV Maastricht players
Footballers from Deventer
Dutch football managers
AFC Ajax managers
Lierse S.K. managers
K.V. Mechelen managers
S.C. Eendracht Aalst managers
AFC Ajax non-playing staff
PAS Giannina F.C. managers
Dutch expatriate football managers
Willem II (football club) non-playing staff
Expatriate football managers in Belgium
Expatriate football managers in Greece
Dutch expatriate sportspeople in Belgium
Dutch expatriate sportspeople in Greece